Madyan may refer to:
 Midian, a geographical place and a people mentioned in the Bible and in the Qur'an
 Madyan, Pakistan, a town in the Swat district of Pakistan